Asion Daja (born 14 March 1990 in Tiranë) is an Albanian football player who plays as a midfielder for Dinamo Tirana.

By signing with Tirana in July 2016, Daja become one of the few players to have represent all the capital teams.

Daja represented Albania at youth levels, playing for the under-17, -19 and -21 levels.

Club career

Youth career
Daja was born in the Albanian capital Tiranë, which is where he began playing football at the age of 8 with local amateur youth side Pallati i Pionerëve under the guidance of coach Hyqmet Kuka. In 2000, he won the Ramazan Kuka Cup with Pallati i Pionerëve, a competition in honour of former international referee Ramazan Kuka. In 2000, he joined the Dinamo Tirana academy where he joined the under-10 side. He worked his way through the ranks and won many regional, national and even international competitions. He excelled in the youth setup at Dinamo, especially in the under-17s and under-19s between 2005 and 2008.

Dinamo Tirana
Towards the end of the 2007–08 season he began to train with the senior Dinamo Tirana side, and with the team firmly in 1st place he was given his senior debut on 10 May 2008 against Besa Kavajë in a 2–1 win; Daja came on in the 89th minute for Goran Vincetić with Dinamo already 2–0 up. Just four days later he came on in the 54th minute away against Vllaznia Shkodër and scored his first ever senior goal in the closing stages of the game to make it 3–0 for the team. He won the league with Dinamo in his debut season.

For the 2008–09 season Daja became first team player but failed to establish himself in the starting line up due to his age and lack of experience. In total he made 13 league appearances and also featured in the Albanian Cup twice. In the league he started just 4 games, and played 90 minutes just twice.

In the 2009–10 season he struggled to play games and was loaned out to fellow Albanian Superliga side Shkumbini Peqin in January for the remainder of the season. He played in 8 league games for Shkumbini Peqin in the second half of the season and managed to help keep the side up. He returned to Dinamo Tirana at the end of the season who were crowned champions of Albania once again.

He played for Dinamo Tirana in qualifying for the 2010–11 UEFA Champions League.

Partizani Tirana
On 8 July 2014, Daja joined Partizani Tirana on a free transfer, signing an initial one-year contract with an option of a further one.

Tirana
In July 2016, Daja begun training with Tirana, and on 11 July he penned a two-year contract.

International career
Daja was called up to play for under-17 side in October 2006 for the UEFA European qualifying match against Finland. On 15 October, he made his competitive debut by playing in a 4–1 loss to Finland.

Personal life
Daja undertook a part-time degree at the Academy of Physical and Sports Education Vojo Kushi, commonly known in Albanian as the Universiteti i Sporteve Të Tiranës. He completed his course from the faculty of movement science in 2014 with 61 points from 100.

On 18 February 2004 at the age of 13 he was a match-day child mascot for Albania's friendly match against Sweden. He walked onto the field at the Qemal Stafa Stadium with striker Alban Bushi in the 2–1 win for Albania.

Career statistics

Honours
Dinamo Tirana

Albanian Superliga: (2) 2007–08, 2009–10
Albanian Supercup:(1) 2008

Tirana
 Albanian Cup: (1) 2016–17
 Albanian Supercup: (1) 2017
 Albanian First Division : Winner Group B
 Albanian First Division : 2017-2018

Teuta
Albanian Superliga: (1) 2020–21 
Albanian Supercup:(2) 2020 ,2021

References

External links

1990 births
Living people
Footballers from Tirana
Albanian footballers
Albania under-21 international footballers
Albania youth international footballers
Association football midfielders
FK Dinamo Tirana players
KS Shkumbini Peqin players
KS Kastrioti players
FK Partizani Tirana players
KF Tirana players
KF Skënderbeu Korçë players
Kategoria Superiore players